The 2018–19 season is CSKA Sofia's 70th season in the First League and their third consecutive participation after their administrative relegation in the third division due to mounting financial troubles. This article shows player statistics and all matches (official and friendly) that the club will play during the 2018–19 season.

Players

Current squad

Transfers

Summer transfers 

In:

Out:

Winter transfers 

In:

Out:

Pre-season and friendlies

Competitions

Parva Liga

Regular Stage

League table

Results summary

Results by round

Results

Championship round

League table

Results summary

Results by round

Results

Bulgarian Cup

UEFA Europa League

First qualifying round

Second qualifying round

Third qualifying round

Squad stats

Appearances and goals

Goal Scorers

Disciplinary Record

See also 
PFC CSKA Sofia

References

External links 
CSKA Official Site

PFC CSKA Sofia seasons
CSKA Sofia
CSKA Sofia